Gelrebia merxmuellerana is a species of legume in the family Fabaceae. It is found only in Namibia.

References

 Craven, P. 2004.  Caesalpinia merxmuellerana. 2006 IUCN Red List of Threatened Species.  Downloaded on 19 July 2007.

Caesalpinieae
Endemic flora of Namibia
Least concern plants
Least concern biota of Africa
Taxonomy articles created by Polbot